Sa Ngalan ng Ina (English: In the Name of the Mother) is a Filipino drama series on TV5. This is the first offering of TV5 Mini Serye which aired only for a month. It first aired on October 3, 2011.

Production

Casting
This marks the television return of Nora Aunor after eight years of hiatus from the United States. Another project of Aunor is a biopic about the life of Emilio Aguinaldo. This is also marks the reunion of Aunor with former husband Christopher de Leon along with their son Ian de Leon. They also worked in the film, I Love You Mama, I Love You Papa in 1986. Another actor added to the cast is Bembol Roco whom he had with Aunor and De Leon in the movie Tatlong Taong Walang Diyos. This is also the first primetime series of Eugene Domingo with TV5, her projects on TV5 were Ha Ha Hayop, Inday Wanda and Lucky Numbers. This is also marks the return of director Mario O'Hara along with independent director Jon Red. O'Hara also worked with Aunor, De Leon and Roco as the director of Tatlong taong walang Diyos. Among those were added are young TV5 talents. After Rod Santiago's The Sisters, this is also Nadine Samonte's second project with the network after her transfer from GMA Network and her first team with Joross Gamboa who was from rival talent search Star Circle Quest. This is also the second primetime project of Star Factor winner Eula Caballero. This is also the second project of Karel Marquez and her first project playing a non-antagonist role and Alwyn Uytingco playing a rebellious role. Both of them worked in Babaeng Hampaslupa.

Location
The production is shot in Taal, Batangas and Antipolo. The provincial capitol of Verano is seen at the Batangas Provincial Capitol in Batangas City while the offices of the Governor of Verano and Mayor of Salvacion is at the Taal Municipal Hall.

Plot
Elena Deogracias (Nora Aunor) is a second wife of a politician. While running for governor of the province of Verano, her husband, Armando Deogracias (Bembol Roco) was assassinated by a grenade explosion. This leads for the Party to replace Amang. They decided for Elena to be his substitute and won as governor of Verano.

Cast

Main cast
 Governor Elena Toribio vda de. Deogracias (Nora Aunor): She was a former housemaid of the Deogracias who eventually became the second wife of Armando Deogracias. After the assassination of Amang, the people of Salvacion decided that it's time for Elena to continue Amang's candidacy for governor of Verano where she will be battling Pepe Ilustre, her former love. She is always wearing black clothes because she is grieving over corruption in the province.
 Governor Jose "Pepe" Ilustre (Christopher de Leon): A paraplegic governor of the province of Verano whom he has a past with Elena before he married Lucia. He will eventually be Elena's opponent in the elections. But in the end, he will help Elena in her fight against corruption.

Supporting cast
 Lucia Ilustre (Rosanna Roces): The wife of Pepe. She will do everything for her husband to win over Elena. She is having an affair with Zaldy.
 Pacita Toribio (Eugene Domingo): Elena's younger sister. Along with Elena's daughter Elsa, she will be helping her sister on her campaign for the elections. She had a deep crush on Zaldy. But, she was later killed by Zaldy.
 Zaldy Sanchez (Ian de Leon): A loyal bodyguard of the Deogracias. On the contrary, he is Lucia's lover. He later killed Pacita and masterminded the assassination of Amang.
 Mayor Andrea Deogracias (Nadine Samonte): The eldest daughter of Amang Deogracias, a professional lawyer and municipal mayor of Salvacion, a position held by her father. She dislikes Elena and will do everything to disown her as a member of the family. She is about to marry Ramoncito Concepcion, but Ramoncito didn't went to their wedding and became she later became pregnant. She forgives Elena after suffering from miscarriage.
 Police Inspector Angelo Deogracias (Edgar Allan Guzman): A policeman and the one that cares about Elena. He is Carmela's boyfriend, although their families are in a dispute. He was accidentally shot by his brother Alfonso.
 Alfonso Deogracias (Alwyn Uytingco): He is really close to Pacita and always involved in gangs and drugs. He will do everything to seek justice for his father's death. He is at-large due to gun smuggling, but decided to help with the authorities and surrenders. He later accepts Elena.
 Elsa Toribio (Eula Caballero): The daughter of Elena out of wedlock. She will be Elena's confidant along with her aunt Pacita after Amang's assassination. She is a juvenile diabetic. She had also a deep feeling over her stepbrother Angelo.
 Carmela Ilustre (Karel Marquez): The obedient and only daughter of Pepe and Lucia. She is very close to her father. She is Angelo's girlfriend.
 Mayor Armando "Amang" Deogracias (Bembol Roco): The mayor of the town of Salvacion. He is Elena's husband and a candidate for the governorship of the province. However, he was assassinated by a grenade explosion.
 Ramoncito Concepcion (Joross Gamboa): A professional lawyer and is engaged to Andrea. He will convince Andrea to support her stepmother's decision to run as a replacement of Amang. He did not go to his wedding with Andrea.
 Manuel (Jay Aquitania): Governor Ilustre's personal assistant. He was killed by Lucia's men.

Extended cast
 Vice Governor Dorinda Fernando (Raquel Villavicencio): The vice governor of Verano and a member of Partido Obrero, of which Amang is their candidate for governor. She will also help Elena on her stint in politics. But, she will plot her downfall.
 Apo Lucas (Leo Rialp): One of the leaders of Partido Obrero. Although Elena is now the governor of Verano, he will do everything to lure her in order to step down.
 Maggie Sarmiento (Joy Viado†) : She was hired by Elena to be an employee of the municipality. A former employee of the budget office of the municipality who works as a nanny in Dubai to experience a something new.
 Greg (Mike Lloren): He is Lucia's personal assistant. Anything that Lucia orders, he follows.
 Police Superintendent Santos (Archie Adamos): The chief of police of Salvacion who shot Angelo while he is being seized. He is being paid by Andrea to escape Alfonso.
 Cathy (Regine Angeles): Alfonso's girlfriend who helped him to hide.

Trivia
 This marks the comeback project of Nora Aunor on television after 8 years. Her last TV project is Bituin aired on ABS-CBN. This is also her second project with TV5. Her first is the Nora Sunday Drama Special aired when TV5 is still ABC 5.
 This is also the reunion of Nora Aunor with former husband Christopher de Leon.
 This marks the reunion of Nora Aunor and Christopher de Leon with their son Ian de Leon. Their last appearance was in the movie, I Love You Mama, I Love You Papa.
 Nora Aunor, Christopher de Leon and Bembol Roco worked in the movie, Tatlong Taong Walang Diyos, which is directed by the series director Mario O'Hara.
 This is the first primetime project of comedian Eugene Domingo on TV5.
 Nora Aunor and Bembol Roco had work in movies Tatlong Taong Walang Diyos and Merika.
 The character of Elena Deogracias, resembles to Nora Aunor's candidacy for governorship of Camarines Sur in 2001. However, she was defeated by then-Governor Luis Villafuerte.
 The series were shot in the province of Batangas whose governor is Nora's on-screen rival and off-screen friend Vilma Santos-Recto, and where Christopher de Leon is the Board Member. However, de Leon is from the Second District upon which Taal is not included.

Awards

See also
 List of programs broadcast by TV5 (Philippines)
 List of shows previously aired by TV5

References 

TV5 (Philippine TV network) drama series
2011 Philippine television series debuts
2011 Philippine television series endings
Philippine drama television series
Filipino-language television shows